Boulevard Raspail is a boulevard of Paris, in France.

Its orientation is north–south, and joins boulevard Saint-Germain with place Denfert-Rochereau whilst traversing 7th, 6th and 14th arrondissements. The boulevard intersects major roadways: rue de Sèvres, rue de Rennes and boulevard du Montparnasse. The allée Claude-Cahun-Marcel-Moore is situated on the boulevard, in front of the Alliance française.

Its former name was boulevard d'Enfer, of which the passage d'Enfer is a vestigial relic.

Naming 
The boulevard was named after François-Vincent Raspail (1794–1878), French chemist, physician and politician.

History 

The section between a point approximately 80 m beyond the rue de Varenne and rue de Sèvres was dug in 1869. The 90 m section from rue Stanislas was opened up by MM. Bernard frères.

The section between boulevard Edgar-Quinet and place Denfert-Rochereau had incorporated the old boulevard d'Enfer and the external boulevard (part of boulevard de Montrouge) into a single road by the law of 16 June 1859. Its width was 70 m before the decree of 14 September 1892.

The modernist architect Le Corbusier criticizes Boulevard Raspail in Toward an Architecture for its disregard of proper proportion and capriciousness.

In 1933, the enlarged part of boulevard Raspail surrounding n° 51, where it meets the rue du Cherche-Midi, was named place Alphonse-Deville. The chemin de ronde d'Enfer was annexed from boulevard Raspail and boulevard Edgar-Quinet.

Sites of interest 
 At n° 48 is an annexe of the Banque de France at the junction of rue de Babylone. 
 l'hôtel Lutetia, un grand hotel, à l'angle de la rue de Babylone, qui accueilli les déportés en 1945, à leur retour des camps nazis.
 At n° 54 is the École des hautes études en sciences sociales (EHESS) (former site of the prison du Cherche-Midi) and at n° 105.
 At the crossroads of boulevard Raspail and boulevard du Montparnasse, also known as place Pablo-Picasso, is home of the statue of Honoré de Balzac by Auguste Rodin since 1939.
 At n° 101, is the headquarters of the Alliance française, state-funded organisation whose mission is to spread French language and culture internationally; it houses a school targeted at students on linguistic exchanges or foreigners who have moved to Paris.
 At n°116–118, at the exit of the Notre-Dame-des-Champs metro station, is the statue of Alfred Dreyfus The statue was commissioned by Jack Lang of French artist "Tim" in 1985, originally meant for the courtyard of the École Militaire where Dreyfus was court martialled in 1895, but was placed instead on the boulevard following the speech of Jacques Chirac in July 2006, to pacify the military.
 At n° 261 (14th arddt), is home of the Cartier Foundation since 1994. It is housed in an avant garde building by Jean Nouvel made of glass steel and concrete. (Photo)
 At n° 291, is the head office of Aéroports de Paris.

References

External links

7th arrondissement of Paris
6th arrondissement of Paris
14th arrondissement of Paris
Boulevards in Paris